This is a list of shopping malls in mainland China.

Shanghai
 Global Harbor
 Grand Gateway
 HKRI Taikoo Hui
 IAPM Mall
 Jing An Kerry Centre
 K11
 Longemont Shopping Centre
 Metro-City
 Plaza 66
 Raffles City
 IFC Mall
 The River Mall
 Super Brand Mall
 Nanjing Road

Beijing
 Beijing apm
 Beijing Department Store
 Beijing Mall
 Dazhalan
 INDIGO
 Pinnacle Plaza
 Raffles City (Dongzhimen)
 Solana Shopping Park
 Taikoo Li Sanlitun
 The Malls at Oriental Plaza

Guangzhou
 CITIC Plaza
 Happy Valley Guangzhou
 Taikoo Hui

Shenzhen
 Coastal City
 Yitian Holiday Plaza
 COCO Park

Chengdu
 Sino-Ocean Taikoo Li Chengdu
 SM City Chengdu
 Taikoo Li Chengdu

Other
 Eurasia Shopping Mall, Changchun
 Hundred Years City, Dalian
 SM City Jinjiang, Jinjiang
 SM City Xiamen, Xiamen
 SM Lifestyle Center, Zibo
 Starlight Place, Chongqing
 Zhongda International, Xi'an

See also
 List of shopping centres in Hong Kong

References

China
Lists of buildings and structures in China